This is a list of the Philippines national football team results from 1980 to 1999.

1980

1981

1983

1984

1985

1986

1987

1989

1991

1993

1995

1996

1997

1998

1999

References

1980s in the Philippines
1990s in the Philippines
1980-1999